Olympia Provisions (formerly Olympic Provisions) is an American meat and restaurant company that produces artisan charcuterie  based out of Portland, Oregon.

Background and history
Founded in 2009 as Olympic Provisions, the company began as Oregon's first USDA salumeria in a 900 square foot production facility attached to a European-inspired restaurant in the Olympic Cereal Mill building. The owners came from a variety of backgrounds, with Nate Tilden also co-owning Clyde Common and Elias Cairo having background as a chef and first generation Greek-American. The idea began when Elias Cairo decided he wanted to open a meat plant inside of a restaurant, and he gathered a group of cofounders which included his sister Michelle, Tilden, Martin Schwartz, and Tyler Gaston. Nate Tilden and Elias Cairo worked together at Castagna prior to opening Olympia Provisions, where Cairo served as head chef. The company began by selling their salami exclusively at farmers' markets and in their restaurant. After receiving nationwide recognition they needed to expand their production facility to meet their demand. In April 2011, Olympia Provisions opened a second restaurant alongside a 4,000 square foot production facility. Two years later, Olympia Provisions had outgrown its second production facility, and in February 2014 production moved to a 34,000 square foot building two blocks from the Southeast restaurant. Currently, Olympia Provisions participates in seventeen farmers' markets throughout the Pacific Northwest. The company's products are sold in Whole Foods and Trader Joe's stores throughout the Northwest region, as well as specialty stores throughout the United States. Additionally, their "Salami of the Month Club" reaches all fifty states.

Name change
In September 2014, the company received a cease and desist notice from the International Olympic Committee, which holds the trademark for the word "olympic" in order to "protect Olympic corporate sponsors against dilution of the value". The company had performed a name search and an LLC search when they first opened, but no trademark issue arose during their research. Originally named after the Olympic Cereal Mill building which housed its first restaurant and production facility, the company agreed to a deal which allowed them to phase out and rebrand to Olympia Provisions throughout 2015.

Restaurants

The company currently owns two European-style restaurants in Portland which share the company name. They are known as Olympia Provisions Southeast and Olympia Provisions Northwest. The first restaurant, which opened in 2009, is located at 107 SE Washington St in Southeast Portland. Their second restaurant opened in April 2011 at 1632 NW Thurman St in Northwest Portland. In 2018, restaurant manager and sommelier, Jessica Hereth, was named as one of Food and Wine magazine's Sommeliers of the Year.

Olympia Provisions Public House

In early 2016, Olympia Provisions opened a small bar-restaurant called OP Wurst, located in Pine Street Market. The restaurant focused on frankfurters, sausages, and beer. Later that year, they opened another OP Wurst in Oregon City at Oregon City Brewing. In March 2017, a third location, and the first OP Wurst located in a stand-alone building, opened on Division Street in Southeast Portland. This third location replaced Honky Tonk Taco, an unrelated taco shop started by Olympia Provisions owners Tilden, Schwartz, and Gaston, which had closed after only three months. The location has an outdoor patio, which the bar-restaurant frequently uses to host events, and in the winter hosts a Christmas tree lot. OP Wurst was rebranded as Olympia Provisions Public House in May 2018, which serves food based on owner Elias Cairo's apprenticeship in Switzerland. This was partially because customers did not recognize that OP Wurst was connected to the Olympia Provisions brand.

Melty and Meaty Sandwich Eatery

On May 4, 2018, Olympia Provisions and Tillamook Cheese collaborated and opened a food truck in Pioneer Courthouse Square in Downtown Portland. The truck sells six types of grilled cheese sandwiches using Olympia Provisions' meat and Tillamook's cheeses.

Cookbook
Olympia Provisions released its first cookbook on October 27, 2015. The book was written by owner Elias Cairo and co-author Meredith Erickson . It was published by Ten Speed Press. The book follows Cairo through Switzerland, where he completed his apprenticeship as a young adult, and includes recipes from the restaurants, the meat plant and his time in Switzerland. It is split into two parts, with one part focusing on meats and another part focusing on recipes from the Olympia Provisions restaurants.

Awards
Olympia Provisions has won fifteen Good Food Awards, and at one time had more than any other entrant.
"Best American Charcuterie" Award, Bon Appetit
"Cutting Edge Butcher Shop" Award, Food & Wine
Sofi Award, Specialty Food Association

|-
! scope="row" | 2011
| Loukanika
| Charcuterie
| Good Food Award
| 
| 
| 
|-
! scope="row" | 2011
| Saucisson d'Arles
| Charcuterie
| Good Food Award
| 
| 
| 
|-
! scope="row" | 2011
| Pork Liver Mousse
| Charcuterie
| Good Food Award
| 
| 
| 
|-
! scope="row" | 2011
| Pickled Corno di Toro Peppers
| Pickles
| Good Food Award
| 
| 
| 
|-
! scope="row" | 2011
| Saveur 100 
| 
| Saveur 100 
| 
| 
| 
|-
! scope="row" | 2012
| Chorizo Navarre
| Charcuterie
| Good Food Award
| 
| 
| 
|-
! scope="row" | 2013
| Lomo Di Parma
| Charcuterie
| Good Food Award
| 
| 
| 
|-
! scope="row" | 2014
| Pickled Corno di Toro Peppers
| Charcuterie
| Good Food Award
| 
| 
| 
|-
! scope="row" | 2014
| Oprah's Favorite Things
| 
| Oprah's Favorite Things
| 
| 
| 
|-
! scope="row" | 2015
| Salami Cotto
| Charcuterie
| Good Food Award
| 
| 
| 
|-
! scope="row" | 2015
| Salami Etna
| Charcuterie
| Good Food Award
| 
| 
| 
|-
! scope="row" | 2016
| Rigani Loukaniko
| Charcuterie
| Good Food Award
| 
| 
| 
|-
! scope="row" | 2017
| Landrauchschinken
| Charcuterie
| Good Food Award
| 
| 
| 
|-
! scope="row" | 2018
| Salami El Rey
| Charcuterie
| Good Food Award
| 
| 
| 
|-
! scope="row" | 2018
| Sommelier of the Year
| 
| Food & Wine
| 
| This award was given to Jessica Hereth
| 
|-
! scope="row" | 2019
| Saucisson Sec
| Charcuterie
| Good Food Award
| 
| 
| 
|-
! scope="row" | 2019
| Saucisson Aux Noisettes de Oregon
| Charcuterie
| Good Food Award
| 
| 
| 
|-
! scope="row" | 2019
| Green Peppercorn Pate
| Charcuterie
| Good Food Award
| 
| 
| 
|-
! scope="row" | 2020
| Rosette de Oregon
| Charcuterie
| Good Food Award
| 
| 
| 
|-
! scope="row" | 2020
| Chorizo Rioja
| Charcuterie
| Good Food Award
| 
| 
| 
|-
! scope="row" | 2020
| Salami Capri
| Charcuterie
| Good Food Award
| 
| 
|

In popular culture
Olympia Provisions SE was featured on a February 2012 episode of Portlandia.
The company was featured on the April 22, 2013 episode of Bizarre Foods America.
Elias Cairo of Olympia Provisions was featured in Epicurious's Price Points as the Sausage Expert

References

External links

 

2009 establishments in Oregon
Companies based in Portland, Oregon
Food and drink companies established in 2009
Privately held companies based in Oregon
Restaurants established in 2009
Restaurants in Oregon
Sausage companies of the United States